Paris to the Moon (2000, Random House) is a book of essays by The New Yorker writer Adam Gopnik.

Overview
The essays detail life in modern Paris and what drew author Gopnik to Paris.

References

2000 non-fiction books
Essay collections
Random House books